Námestovo District (okres Námestovo) is a district in the Žilina Region of central Slovakia. 
Until 1918, the district was part of Árva County, an administrative division of the Kingdom of Hungary.

Municipalities

References 

Districts of Slovakia
Žilina Region